Kahurabad-e Chahchupan-e Do (also Romanized as Kahūrābād-e Chāhchūpān-e Do; also known as Kahūrābād-e Chāhchūpān) is a village in Howmeh Rural District, in the Central District of Kahnuj County, Kerman Province, Iran. At the 2006 census, its population was 763, in 143 families.

References 

Populated places in Kahnuj County